Chorizanthe obovata is a species of flowering plant in the buckwheat family known by the common name spoonsepal spineflower. It is endemic to California, where it grows in the mountains of the Central Coast Range from Monterey to Santa Barbara Counties.

Chorizanthe obovata grows in chaparral and woodland habitat. The plant is variable in appearance, growing prostrate or erect, its stem up to 40 centimeters long. The herbage is red to gray-green in color and hairy in texture. The inflorescence is a cluster of flowers surrounded by six bracts, each tipped with hooked awns except the longest, which may have a straight awn. The flower itself is 4 or 5 millimeters wide and white to pinkish in color.

References

External links
Jepson Manual Treatment
Reveal Treatment & Photos
Photo gallery

obovata
Endemic flora of California
Natural history of the California chaparral and woodlands
Natural history of the California Coast Ranges
Natural history of San Luis Obispo County, California
Natural history of Santa Barbara County, California